Mayako Kubo (born 5 December 1947) is a Japanese pianist and composer.

Biography
Mayako Kubo was born in Kobe, Japan, and studied piano at Osaka College of Music. In 1972 she continued her studies in composition with Roman Haubenstock-Ramati and Erich Urbanner in Vienna, where she composed her first pieces of tape music at the Institute of Electroacoustics and Experimental Music. In the 1980s she studied with Helmut Lachenmann in Hannover and Stuttgart and then musicology with Carl Dahlhaus in Berlin.

In 1989 Kubo became interested in dramaturgy and theatrical performance, and in 1990 moved to Italy, but then returned to live and work in Berlin in 1994.

Honors and awards
1978 – 1979 Federal Ministry for Education, Art and Culture: work *scholarship
1979 International Contest for Electronic and Experimental Music, *Bourges: award
1980 City of Vienna: work scholarship
1982 – 1983 Alban Berg Foundation: scholarship
1983 – 1984 Ministry of Science and Research of Lower Saxony: scholarship for artists (Schreyahn)
1989 Cultural Senate Berlin: work scholarship
1999 Japan Foundation: fellow
2000 – 2001 Bundesmusikakademie Rheinsberg: work scholarship
2002 Hanse Wissenschaftskolleg: fellow
2004 Berlin Senate: scholarship
2004 – 2007 Yaddo Foundation: scholarship
2006 Bogliasco Foundation: fellow

Works
Selected works include:
Rashomon, opera (1996; Japanese version 2002)
Osan – Secret of Love, opera (2003/2004)
Der Spinnfaden, opera (The Spinning Thread, 2010)
Margeriten weiss in Flaschenbegleitung, scenic music (2004)
Hyperion-Fragmente, music theatre (2001)
 1. Symphony (1993/98)
 2. Symphony (2000)
Piano Concerto (1985/86)
Sanriku-Lieder (2011)
Mirlitonnades – 24 Lieder (2005)
Solo für Kontrabass (2005)
Berlinisches Tagebuch, piano cycle (1989/90)
Yogi for mixed chorus a cappella (1980)

Her work has been recorded and issued on media, including:
 Wohin, Trio, Ensemble KU, Label: Kreuzberg Records, 2011
 AtemPause, Guitar quartett, Label: UNIMOZ, 2008
 Rashomon opera, Label: edition Ariadne, 1996
Piano Recital: Ikeya-Fuchino – SOEGIJO, P.G. / GOURZI, K. / ERDMANN, D. / STAEMPFLI, E. / SIMON, A. / KUBO, M. (Berlinisches Tagebuch), Label: Thorofon, 1991

Bibliography
 Uebersetzung – Transformation, hrsg. H. Yamamoto/C. Ivanovic. Koenigshausen & Neumann, Wuerzburg, 2010
 Komponisten der Gegenwart, Edition Text und Kritik, Muenchen, 2009 rev.
 Opera in Japan. Yearbook (Opera-Nenkan) 2005 and 2008, Japan Opera Association, Tokio 2006 and 2009
 Grove Dictionary of Music and Musicians, 2nd edition

External links
 Music Information Center Austria 
 Publisher Verlag Neue Musik
 Mayako Kubo Website

References

1947 births
20th-century classical composers
20th-century German composers
20th-century Japanese musicians
21st-century classical composers
21st-century German composers
21st-century Japanese musicians
German classical composers
German classical pianists
German women classical composers
Japanese classical composers
Japanese classical pianists
Japanese women pianists
Japanese women classical composers
Living people
Women classical pianists
21st-century classical pianists
20th-century women composers
21st-century women composers
20th-century German women
21st-century German women
21st-century Japanese women musicians
20th-century women pianists
21st-century women pianists